The River Dhoo is a river on the Isle of Man. The river rises in Marown and flows east towards Douglas through the central valley of the island, passing Crosby and Union Mills before meeting with the River Glass on the outskirts of Douglas where it flows out to sea through Douglas Harbour. The Dhoo (meaning black or dark in Manx) and the Glass (meaning clear or green) converge to form the River Douglas. It has a length of approx. .

More recent research suggests that the name is one of the oldest place-names in the island and comes from the early Celtic term 'duboglassio’ meaning 'black/dark stream'. This is a common name throughout the British Isles and is Dulas in Wales and Dawlish in England.

References 

Dhoo